The  is an AC electric multiple unit (EMU) commuter train type on order by Hokkaido Railway Company (JR Hokkaido). Scheduled for a 2023 service introduction, thirteen 2-car sets (26 vehicles) will be built to replace the fleet of KiHa 143 diesel railcars operated on the Muroran Main Line. The trainsets mark the return of local EMU services on the Muroran Main Line since the retirement of the 711 series from these services in October 2012.

The 737 series will be the first commuter train type operated by JR Hokkaido to allow for driver-only operation.

History 
The first two sets, C-1 and C-2, were delivered in November 2022. The sets were manufactured by Hitachi at its Kasado facility. Training took place in January and February 2023.

The first day of revenue service for these trainsets is projected to take place on 20 May 2023.

Configuration 

The capacity is listed at 269 passengers per trainset, of which, 93 are seated.

References

External links 

 JR Hokkaido press release 

Electric multiple units of Japan
737
Train-related introductions in 2023
Hitachi multiple units
20 kV AC multiple units